Antonio Zeno may refer to:

Antonio Zeno (bishop) (died 1503), Italian Roman Catholic bishop
Antonio Zeno (died 1403), Italian nobleman from Venice and one of the Zeno brothers